Bees in His Bonnet is a 1918 American short comedy film featuring Harold Lloyd. It is presumed to be lost.

Cast

 Harold Lloyd
 Snub Pollard
 Bebe Daniels
 William Blaisdell
 Sammy Brooks
 Lige Conley (as Lige Cromley)
 William Gillespie
 Helen Gilmore
 Bud Jamison
 Charles Stevenson
 Noah Young

See also
 List of American films of 1918
 Harold Lloyd filmography
 List of lost films

References

External links

Bees in His Bonnet at SilentEra

1918 films
1918 comedy films
1918 short films
American silent short films
American black-and-white films
Films directed by Gilbert Pratt
Lost American films
Silent American comedy films
American comedy short films
1918 lost films
Lost comedy films
1910s American films